Muktikā (Sanskrit: मुक्तिका) refers to the Telugu-language anthology of a canon of 108 Upaniṣhads. The date of composition of each is unknown, with the oldest probably from about 800 BCE. The Principal Upanishads were composed in the 1st millennium BCE, most Yoga Upanishads composed probably from the 100 BCE to 300 CE period, and seven of the Sannyasa Upanishads composed before the 3rd century CE.

Muktikā refers to the collection of 108 Upanishads available in printed form since 1883 CE in the Telugu language. The canon is part of a dialogue between Rama and Hanuman dealing with the inquiry into  in the Muktikā Upanishad (108 in the list). The other collections of Upanishads include Oupanekhat, a Persian language anthology of 50 Upanishads; the Colebrooke Collection of 52 Upanishads, and the 52 Upanishad Collection of Nārāyana.

The canon
The canon is part of a dialogue between Lord Rama and Hanuman. Rama proposes to teach Vedanta, saying "Even by reading one verse of them [any Upanishad] with devotion, one gets the status of union with me, which is hard to get even by sages." Hanuman inquires about the different kinds of "liberation" (or mukti, hence the name of the Upanishad), to which Lord Rama answers, "The only real type [of liberation] is Kaivalya."

The list of 108 Upanishads is introduced in verses 26-29:

Most scholars list ten upanishads as principal, or the Mukhya Upanishads, while some consider eleven, twelve or thirteen as principal, or the most important Upanishads (highlighted).

The list of 108 names is given in verses 30–39. They are as follows:

Isha Upanishad
Kena Upanishad
Katha Upanishad
Prashna Upanishad
Mundaka Upanishad
Mandukya Upanishad
Taittiriya Upanishad
Aitareya Upanishad
Chandogya Upanishad
Brihadaranyaka Upanishad
Brahma Upanishad
Kaivalya Upanishad
Jabala Upanishad
Shvetashvatara Upanishad
 Hamsopanishad
Aruneya Upanishad
Garbhopanishad
 Narayanopanishad
 Paramahamsopanishad
Amritabindu Upanishad
Amritanada Upanishad
 Atharvashiras Upanishad
Atharvashikha Upanishad
Maitrayaniya Upanishad
Kaushitaki Upanishad
Brihajjabala Upanishad
 Nrisimha Tapaniya Upanishad
Kalagni Rudra Upanishad
Maitreya Upanishad
Subala Upanishad
Kshurika Upanishad
Mantrika Upanishad
Sarvasara Upanishad
Niralamba Upanishad
Shukarahasya Upanishad
Vajrasuchi Upanishad
Tejobindu Upanishad
Nada Bindu Upanishad
Dhyanabindu Upanishad
Brahmavidya Upanishad
Yogatattva Upanishad
Atmabodha Upanishad
Naradaparivrajaka Upanishad
Trishikhibrahmana Upanishad
Sita Upanishad
Yogachudamani Upanishad
Nirvana Upanishad
Mandala-brahmana Upanishad
Dakshinamurti Upanishad
Sharabha Upanishad
Skanda Upanishad
Mahanarayana Upanishad
Advayataraka Upanishad
Rama Rahasya Upanishad
Rama tapaniya Upanishad
Vasudeva Upanishad
Mudgala Upanishad
Shandilya Upanishad
Paingala Upanishad
Bhikshuka Upanishad
Maha Upanishad
Sariraka Upanishad
Yogashikha Upanishad
Turiyatitavadhuta Upanishad
Brihat-Sannyasa Upanishad
Paramahamsa Parivrajaka Upanishad
Malika Upanishad
Avyakta Upanishad
Ekakshara Upanishad
Annapurna Upanishad
Surya Upanishad
Akshi Upanishad
Adhyatma Upanishad
Kundika Upanishad
Savitri Upanishad
Atma Upanishad
Pashupatabrahma Upanishad
Parabrahma Upanishad
Avadhuta Upanishad
Tripuratapini Upanishad
Devi Upanishad
Tripura Upanishad
Kathashruti Upanishad
Bhavana Upanishad
Rudrahridaya Upanishad
Yoga-Kundalini Upanishad
Bhasma Upanishad
Rudraksha Upanishad
Ganapati Upanishad
Darshana Upanishad
Tarasara Upanishad
Mahavakya Upanishad
Pancabrahma Upanishad
Pranagnihotra Upanishad
Gopala Tapani Upanishad
Krishna Upanishad
Yajnavalkya Upanishad
Varaha Upanishad
Shatyayaniya Upanishad
Hayagriva Upanishad
Dattatreya Upanishad
Garuda Upanishad
Kali-Santarana Upanishad
Jabali Upanishad
Saubhagyalakshmi Upanishad
Sarasvati-rahasya Upanishad
Bahvricha Upanishad
 Muktikā Upanishad (this text)

Transmission
Almost all printed editions of ancient Vedas and Upanishads depend on the late manuscripts that are hardly older than 500 years, not on the still-extant and superior oral tradition. Michael Witzel explains this oral tradition as follows:

Categories
In this canon,
10 upaniṣads are associated with the Rigveda and have the śānti beginning .
16 upaniṣads are associated with the Samaveda and have the śānti beginning .
19 upaniṣads are associated with the Shukla Yajurveda and have the śānti beginning .
32 upaniṣads are associated with the Krishna Yajurveda and have the śānti beginning .
31 upaniṣads are associated with the Atharvaveda and have the śānti beginning .

The first 13 are grouped as mukhya ("principal"), and 21 are grouped as Sāmānya Vedānta ("common Vedanta"). The remainder are associated with five different schools or sects within Hinduism, 20 with Sannyāsa (asceticism), 8 with Shaktism, 14 with Vaishnavism, 12 with Shaivism and 20 with Yoga.

References

Muktika Upanishad, Translated by Dr. A. G. Krishna Warrier, Published by The Theosophical Publishing House, Chennai,

External links

Muktika Upanishad - Translated by: Dr. A. G. Krishna Warrier The Theosophical Publishing House, Chennai
108 Upanishads of the Muktika

Books about the Upanishads